The Crow House near Star City, Arkansas is a historic house that was built in about 1874.  It was listed on the National Register of Historic Places in 1976.  The house is a dog-trot style house that was built of cypress wood in about 1874.  In 1976, the house had been vacant for about five years, but had structural integrity.  It was deemed significant for NRHP listing as an example of a late-1800s rural farmhouse.

See also
National Register of Historic Places listings in Lincoln County, Arkansas

References 

Houses on the National Register of Historic Places in Arkansas
Houses completed in 1874
Houses in Lincoln County, Arkansas
National Register of Historic Places in Lincoln County, Arkansas
1874 establishments in Arkansas
Dogtrot architecture in Arkansas